Pakistan Tenpin Bowling Federation (PTFB) is the governing body of bowling in Pakistan.

Affiliations 
The Federation is a member of the Asian Bowling Federation and World Bowling. The Federation is affiliated with the Pakistan Sports Board.

See also
Sports in Pakistan

External links
 Official Website

References

 

Sports governing bodies in Pakistan
Bowling organizations
Ten-pin bowling in Pakistan